Jennifer Ann Spediacci (born 5 April 1978) is an Italian-American, former collegiate All-American, 2004 Olympian, right-handed batting softball pitcher, originally from Fremont, California. She was a student athlete for the Washington Huskies from 1997-00 in the Pac-12 Conference, competing in four Women's College World Series and holding the school ERA record. She also who competed in the 2004 Summer Olympics.

College

Spediacci was a Second Team All-Pac-12 as a freshman and a three-time First Team in her other years. She was named Pitcher of the Year in 2000. Spediacci was also a two-time National Fastpitch Coaches All-American for both the Second Team in 1998 and First Team as a senior. She led the Huskies to four straight college World Series and a national runner up finish in the 1999 Women's College World Series and a No. 1 ranking in 2000. As a senior, Spediacci struck out a career best 18 batters in a win against the Oregon State Beavers on May 13. She also won her 100th game on May 25 against the DePaul Blue Demons at that year's World Series.

Spediacci's career record at the World Series includes: going 7-2 with 57 strikeouts in 61.1 innings, surrendering 34 hits, 14 earned runs, 10 walks for a 1.60 ERA and 0.72 WHIP. She also contributed 4 hits, 5 walks and an RBI at the plate.

Statistics

Washington Huskies

References

External links

1978 births
Living people
Softball players from California
Italian softball players
Olympic softball players of Italy
Softball players at the 2004 Summer Olympics
Washington Huskies softball players